The statue of Frank Sinatra in Hoboken, New Jersey is located along Sinatra Park section of the Hudson River Waterfront Walkway named for local legend Frank Sinatra,

Statue

It depicts Sinatra at the age of 45 leaning against a lamppost and tipping his hat. It was created by Carolyn D. Palmer and dedicated in 2021 on December 12, the date of Sinatra's birth in 1915. A plaque placed by the city in 1989 is also located in the park.

Significance
Sinatra's early life was spent in Hoboken, where he was born and raised. He was awarded the Key to the City of by Mayor Fred M. De Sapio on October 30, 1947. In 2003 the city's main post office was designated the Frank Sinatra Post Office Building.  

A bronze plaque, placed two years before Sinatra’s death in 1998, marks the site of the house where he was born. There is also a commemorative marker in front of Hoboken Historical Museum, which has artifacts from his life and conducts Sinatra walking tours through the city.

See also
List of public art in Jersey City, New Jersey
Statue of Lucille Ball

References

External links
Caroline D. Palmer

2021 establishments in New Jersey
2021 sculptures
Bronze sculptures in New Jersey
Buildings and structures in Hoboken, New Jersey
Frank Sinatra
Hoboken, New Jersey
Monuments and memorials in New Jersey
Outdoor sculptures in New Jersey
Public art in Hudson County, New Jersey
Statues in New Jersey
Statues of musicians in the United States
Tourist attractions in Hudson County, New Jersey